The ninth series of Love Island began broadcasting on 16 January 2023 to 13 March 2023 on ITV2. It is the second winter edition of the series and the first to be presented by Maya Jama, who took over from Laura Whitmore. Iain Stirling returned to narrate the series.

On 13 March 2023, the series was won by Kai Fagan and Sanam Harrinanan with 43.75% of the final vote, becoming the first couple formed during the Casa Amor twist to win the series. Lana Jenkins and Ron Hall finished as runners-up.

Production
In June 2022, prior to the conclusion of the previous series, it was confirmed that the show would return for two series to be broadcast in 2023, with ITV announcing that the show would air a winter edition for the first time since 2020, and as in the sixth series, the ninth series would be filmed in Cape Town, South Africa. It is set to be broadcast in January 2023. On 22 August 2022, Laura Whitmore announced she would be stepping down as presenter after three series. Citing her reasons for leaving, Whitmore said she had found "certain elements of the show very difficult" [...] and that flying back and forth to South Africa "conflicted with [her] new projects".

Following media speculation, ITV confirmed Maya Jama as the new presenter on 12 October. Upon her appointment as presenter, Jama said: "I’ve always been such a massive Love Island fan and I'm so excited to be hosting one of the nation's favourite shows! I can't wait to get into the villa to meet all of the Islanders." The winner of the previous series, Ekin-Su Cülcüloğlu, said she was approached to present the show, but turned it down due to other work commitments. However, a show insider denied the reports and claimed that Jama was the "first pick" to host the series.

The first trailer for the series aired on 26 December 2022, which featured a five-second clip of a spinning bejewelled pink velvet mechanical bull. A full-length trailer was released on 1 January 2023, which included host Jama riding the bull and teasing the series with the tagline "It's time to grab love by the horns, I'm ready, are you?". The series premiered on ITV2 on 16 January 2023, exclusively in the UK and will later be available on Hulu in the US after two weeks of broadcast.

Islanders
The original Islanders for the ninth series were announced on 9 January 2023, one week before the series launch. For the first time, Love Island included a partially-sighted islander. Ron Hall is a financial advisor who is blind in one eye as a result of a football injury he sustained when he was 8 years old.

On 12 January, it was announced that the public would decide the first "bombshell" of the series and a vote was opened for the viewers to choose between Ellie Spence, a 25-year-old business development executive from Norwich and Tom Clare, a 23-year-old semi-professional footballer from Barnsley. The winner of the vote, and therefore the first ''bombshell'' was Tom.

On 20 January, for the first time it was confirmed that the latest two "bombshells" would be islanders that have already previously appeared on the Australian version of the show. Aaron Waters, who had taken part in the third series, as well as Jessie Wynter who had appeared in the second series.

This series has become the first since the third series where an islander hasn't walked or been removed from the villa.

Coupling
The couples were chosen shortly after the islanders enter the villa.

Notes

 : Four days before the show's launch, voting opened for the public to decide the first bombshell of the series. They chose Tom, who arrived shortly after the first coupling of the series. He was told he would be able to steal a girl for himself on Day 2. He chose Olivia, leaving Will single.
 :Original Islanders were only given the option to remain in their current couple, or re-couple with one of the new Islanders.

Weekly summary
The main events in the Love Island villa are summarised in the table below.

Ratings
Official ratings are taken from BARB. Because the Saturday episodes are "Unseen Bits" episodes rather than nightly highlights, these are not included in the overall averages. Viewing figures are consolidated 7-day viewing figures with pre-broadcast viewing and viewing on tablets, PCs and smartphones included.

Notes 
 :This episode wasn’t included in the weekly Top 50 ratings and was watched by Under 2.93m viewers.
 :This episode wasn’t included in the weekly Top 50 ratings and was watched by Under 2.95m viewers.
 :This episode wasn’t included in the weekly Top 50 ratings and was watched by Under 2.90m viewers.
 :This episode wasn’t included in the weekly Top 50 ratings and was watched by Under 2.94m viewers.
 :This episode wasn’t included in the weekly Top 50 ratings and was watched by Under 2.73m viewers.
 :This episode wasn’t included in the weekly Top 50 ratings and was watched by Under 2.79m viewers.
 :This episode wasn’t included in the weekly Top 50 ratings and was watched by Under 2.73m viewers.

References

2023 British television seasons
Love Island (2015 TV series)
Television shows set in Cape Town
Television shows set in South Africa